Letago Madiba (born 15 July 1991) is a South African soccer player who plays as a forward for Fatih Vatan Spor in the Turkish Women's Super League. She has been a member of the South Africa women's national team.

Private life 
Letago Madiba was born at Arthur's Seat of Bushbuckridge town in Mpumalanga Province, South Africa on 15 July 1991, into a family with four elder brothers.

She graduated from Lekete High School in Arthur's Seat, Bushbuckridge, and holds a BTech degree in Sport and Exercise science from Tshwane University of Technology. She graduated with a Master's degree in Organisational leadership in 2021.

Early career 
Madiba started playing football already at the age of five in the streets of Arthur's Seat. Her brother Karabo, who would become a professional footballer, taught her the basics and skills. From a young age, she played with boys in the community, and became the only female football player in school.

Club career 
In her early career, she was a defender. She played for the South African Tshwane University of Technology's team TUT Ladies in the SAFA Sasol Women's League. She capped for South Africa 54 times in the 2016–17 and 2017–18 seasons, scoring a total of 82 goals. In addition, she netted 31 goals in various tournaments for the university team. Overall, she appeared in 75 games in the Sasol League, and scored a total of 103 goals, winning the championship in 2017–18. She won also the University Sports South Africa (USSA) Football National Club Championship and the ABSA Women's Championship.

In 2018, although she decided to retire from football to seek permanent employment, her team coach Tebogo Mokae convinced her to finish the season. In February 2019, she got a chance to go to Spain, where she trained for a month with two clubs, which helped renew her confidence in a football career.

The assistant coach of TUT Ladies, Nadia Kroll, offered her a contract to play in Belarus. Madiba had to decide within three days, as the Belarusian club was in preparation for a major European tournament. Her childhood dream of playing overseas came through when she took that chance. In July 2019, she moved to Belarus, and joined ZFK Minsk two weeks before their participation at the 2019–20 UEFA Women's Champions League qualifying round. She played in two of the three qualification matches, and scored one goal.

Arranged by her manager Kroll, she went to Turkey in October 2019, and signed a contract to play as a forward with ALG Spor, a club in Gaziantep, who had just been promoted to the Women's First League at the end of the 2017–18 season. She scored eleven goals in 14 matches of the 2019-20 Turkish Women's First Football League season, before it was discontinued due to the COVID-19 pandemic in Turkey. Her team was entitled to represent Turkey at the 2020–21 UEFA Women's Champions League, as the top-ranking team, when the league was stopped.

In the 2020–21 Turkcell Women's League, she transferred to Fatih Vatan Spor in Istanbul.

International career 
In April 2014, Madiba was admitted to the South Africa women's national team, nicknamed "Banyana Banyana", to play in a friendly match against Zimbabwe, During a national team camp just before the 2014 African Women's Championship, she tore her ACL, LCL, and meniscus. She underwent two surgeries, knocking her out of action for 14 months.

She was called up to the national team for the 2017 COSAFA Women's Championship – Group C matches, but only played in a handful of matches.

Career statistics

Honours 
 ZFK Minsk 
 Belarusian Premier League 2019
 Belarusian Women's Cup 2019

 Turkish Women's First League
 Fatih Vatan Spor
 Runners-up (1): 2020–21

References 

1991 births
Living people
People from Bushbuckridge
South African women's soccer players
Women's association football defenders
Women's association football forwards
FC Minsk (women) players
ALG Spor players
Fatih Vatan Spor players
Turkish Women's Football Super League players
South Africa women's international soccer players
South African expatriate soccer players
South African expatriates in Belarus
Expatriate women's footballers in Belarus
South African expatriate sportspeople in Turkey
Expatriate women's footballers in Turkey